Richard James Kenneth Tuckey, Jr. (September 29, 1913 – December 1974) was an American football running back in the National Football League for the Cleveland Rams and the Washington Redskins.  He attended Manhattan College.

1913 births
1974 deaths
Players of American football from New Haven, Connecticut
American football running backs
Manhattan College alumni
Cleveland Rams players
Washington Redskins players
People from Naugatuck, Connecticut